Fatma Ay (born May 1, 1992) is a Turkish women's handballer, who plays in the Turkish Women's Handball Super League for Muratpaşa Bld. SK, and the Turkey national team. The -tall sportswoman is goalkeeper.

Playing career

Club
Fatma Ay joined Antalya-based Muratpaşa Bld. SK in 2010.

She took part at the Women's EHF Challenge Cup matches in 2010–11 and 2011–12, which her team finished both as runner-up. She played in the Women's EHF Cup Winners' Cup matches (2012–13 and 2013–14), at the Women's EHF Champions League competitions (2012–13 and 2013–14) as well as at the Women's EHF Cup games (2014–15 and 2015–16).

International
In 2009, Fatna Ay was admitted to the Turkey women's national beach handball team.

She is a member of the Turkey women's national handball team. She took part at the 2014 European Women's Handball Championship qualification matches.

Honours
Turkish Handball Super League
 Winners (3): 2011–12, 2012–13, 2013–14.  
 Runner-up (1): 2014–15.
 Third place (1): 2010–11.

References 

1992 births
People from Afyonkarahisar
Turkish female handball players
Turkish beach handball players
Muratpaşa Bld. SK (women's handball) players
Turkey women's national handball players
Living people
21st-century Turkish sportswomen